The Last Dance Tour is the sixth concert tour in Japan and eleventh overall by South Korean boy band Big Bang. The tour began on November 18, 2017 in Fukuoka, Japan and concluded on December 31, 2017 in Seoul, South Korea. BigBang broke their own record by being the only foreign act to hold a dome-sized arena tour in Japan for the fifth consecutive year. The oldest member T.O.P did not perform on this tour due to his mandatory military service in South Korea which began in February 2017.

Background
YG Entertainment announced on August 8, 2017 that BigBang will be holding their last tour in Japan before their upcoming hiatus due to South Korean mandatory military conscription. On the Last Dance Tour, BigBang became the very first foreign artist in Japan to hold a dome tour for the fifth consecutive year. BigBang performed 14 concerts across four cities: Fukuoka, Osaka, Nagoya, and Tokyo; a total of 696,000 fans attended the Japanese leg. As a result, BigBang's Dome Tour since 2013 attracted a total of 4,205,500 fans, a record for overseas singers. On October 19, the final shows of the tour was announced to be held at Gocheok Sky Dome in Seoul on December 30 and 31. Two shows from the tour, the Tokyo Dome concert on December 13 and the Seoul concert on December 30 is due to be broadcast live across 109 cinemas in Japan.

Set lists

Tour dates

References

External links
 Official website

2017 concert tours
BigBang (South Korean band) concert tours
Concert tours of Japan